Francesco Rossignoli (born 3 February 1963) is a former Italian racing cyclist. He rode in the Tour de France and the Giro d'Italia.

References

External links
 

1963 births
Living people
Italian male cyclists
Cyclists from the Province of Verona